Mutt and Jeff may refer to:

 Mutt and Jeff, a comic strip created by Bud Fisher in 1907
 Mutt and Jeff (spies), two spies for the Allies in World War II
 "Mutt and Jeff", a method of interrogation, also called Good cop/bad cop
 "Mutt and Jeff", a type of "pair" of World War 1 British campaign medals
 "Mutt and Jeff" is Cockney rhyming slang for "deaf"